Austrogomphus angelorum, also known as Austrogomphus (Austrogomphus) angelorum, is a species of dragonfly of the family Gomphidae, 
commonly known as the Murray River hunter. 
It inhabits slow-flowing parts of the Murray River in South Australia and on the border of New South Wales and Victoria.

Austrogomphus angelorum is a tiny to medium-sized, black and yellow dragonfly.

Gallery

See also
 List of Odonata species of Australia

References

Gomphidae
Odonata of Australia
Endemic fauna of Australia
Taxa named by Robert John Tillyard
Insects described in 1913